Angela Ndambuki (born in 1980), is a Kenyan lawyer and corporate executive. She was appointed as the Regional Director of the International Federation of the Phonographic Industry (IFPI) for Sub-Saharan Africa, effective 1 July 2020. She is responsible for 46 countries, based in Nairobi, Kenya's capital and largest city.

Before that, from September 2017 until June 2020, she served as  the chief executive officer (CEO) of the Kenya National Chamber of Commerce and Industry. She previously served as the CEO of the Performers Rights Society of Kenya (PRISK).

She is also an accomplished performing and recording artist, and was a member of the all-girl group called Tatuu. The group later separated for them to work on their individual projects.

Background and education
Angela was born in Mombasa, Kenya circa 1980, and attended local schools for her primary and secondary education. She obtained  Bachelor of Laws (LLB) degree from the University of Nairobi. She also holds a Postgraduate Diploma in Law (Dip.Law), awarded by the Kenya School of Law. She is a member of the Kenya Bar. Her Master of Laws (LLM) degree specializing in intellectual property rights, was obtained from the University of Edinburgh, in Scotland.

Career
In 1998, Angela Ndambuki met Debbie Asila for the first time. The following year, she met Angela Mwandanda. They all had a passion to perform. The three became friends and started performing plays together, including at the French Cultural Centre and at the British Council in Nairobi, Kenya's capital city.

After passing the bar examinations, she and others founded the Performers Rights Society of Kenya (PRISK). In an interview with The Standard (Kenya) newspaper in October 2015, Angela says that she worked for two years without a salary while cobbling the society together. She rose to the position of General Manager by January 2009, serving in that capacity until October 2012. In November 2012, she was promoted to the position of CEO at PRISK, working in that capacity until September 2017.

Family
Angela Ndambuki is married to Roy, and together are the parents of two daughters. The older daughter was born circa 2007 and the younger one was born circa 2013.

Other considerations
In October 2017, she was named among "Top 40 Women Under 40 In Kenya 2017", by the Business Daily Africa newspaper, based in Nairobi, Kenya and published by the Nation Media Group.

See also
 Borna Nyaoke-Anoke
 Kellen Kariuki
 Iddah Asin
 Flora Mutahi

References

External links
 Website of International Federation of the Phonographic Industry

Living people
1979 births
Kenyan musicians
Kenyan stage actresses
21st-century Kenyan lawyers
Kenyan women lawyers
University of Nairobi alumni
Kenya School of Law alumni
Alumni of the University of Edinburgh
Kenyan women business executives
Kenyan chief executives
People from Mombasa County